Cantharellus luteopunctatus is a species of fungus in the genus Cantharellus. Found in Africa, it was described as new to science in 1928 by Belgian mycologist Maurice Beeli as Lentinus luteopunctatus. Paul Heinemann transferred it to Cantharellus in 1958.

References

External links

Cantharellales
Fungi described in 1928
Fungi of Africa